Kevin George O'Brien MHA, (born August 25, 1956) is a Canadian businessman, pharmacist and politician in Newfoundland and Labrador, Canada. He served as the province's Minister of Advanced Education and Skills. O'Brien was elected to the Newfoundland and Labrador House of Assembly as a member of the Progressive Conservative Party (PC) in 2003, representing the district of Gander until his resignation in 2015. He resigned his provincial seat on July 3, 2015 to run federally in the 2015 federal election.

Politics
O'Brien was elected to the Newfoundland and Labrador House of Assembly as a member of the Progressive Conservative Party in 2003 representing the district of Gander. He was appointed to Cabinet in July 2006, becoming the Minister of Business. Following his re-election in 2007, O'Brien was shuffled into the portfolio of Government Services. With the death of fellow Municipal Affairs Minister Dianne Whalen in October 2010 O'Brien was shuffled out of the Government Services portfolio and into Municipal Affairs.

In September 2013, O'Brien was accused by the Gander Chamber of Commerce of threatening to slow down construction of a new school in Gander if NDP representatives were allowed to be present at a community breakfast. The Chamber of Commerce also alleged that O'Brien had made similar threats in the past.  O'Brien denied the allegations.

On October 9, 2013, O'Brien was shuffled to Minister of Advanced Education. In March 2015, O'Brien resigned from cabinet.

In July 2015, O'Brien resigned his provincial seat to run for the federal Conservative party in the riding of Coast of Bays—Central—Notre Dame in the 2015 federal election. On October 19, 2015, O'Brien was defeated in the federal election by Liberal incumbent Scott Simms.

Electoral record

|-

|-

|-

|NDP
|Lukas Norman
|align="right"|770
|align="right"|16.82%
|align="right"|
|}

|-

|-

|}

|-

|-

|-

|NDP
|Steve Johnson
|align="right"|348
|align="right"|5.89
|align="right"|
|}

|NDP
|Roy Locke
|align="right"|193
|align="right"|3.1%
|align="right"|
|-
|}

References

Members of the Executive Council of Newfoundland and Labrador
Progressive Conservative Party of Newfoundland and Labrador MHAs
Living people
1956 births
Conservative Party of Canada candidates for the Canadian House of Commons
Newfoundland and Labrador candidates for Member of Parliament